Stars in Their Eyes was a TVNZ talent show, based on the original British version. It was hosted by Simon Barnett.

2008 season
The finalists were:

Episode 1 (22 April 2008)

Episode 2 (29 April 2008)

Episode 3 (6 May 2008)

Episode 4 (13 May 2008)

Episode 5 (20 May 2008)

Episode 6 (27 May 2008)

Episode 7 (3 June 2008)

Episode 8 (10 June 2008)

Episode 9 (17 June 2008)

2009 season
The finalists were:

Episode 1 (28 April 2009)

Episode 2 (5 May 2009)

Episode 3 (12 May 2009)

Episode 4 (19 May 2009)

Episode 5 (26 May 2009)

Episode 6 (2 June 2009)

Episode 7 (9 June 2009)

Episode 8 (16 June 2009)

Episode 9 (23 June 2009)

Singing talent shows
2008 New Zealand television series debuts
2009 New Zealand television series endings
New Zealand reality television series
New Zealand music television series
English-language television shows
TVNZ 1 original programming